Simmons-Boardman Publishing is an American publisher, specializing in industry publications. It is headquartered in New York City, New York, and has offices in Chicago, Omaha, and Falmouth, Cornwall, UK. The company was created from a merger of The Railroad Gazette and Railway Age in 1908; the company's name was derived from Gazettes vice president, E. A. Simmons, and editor, William H. Boardman.

Publications

Bar Business Magazine
International Railway Journal
Marine Log
Railway Age
Railway Track & Structures
Sign Builder Illustrated Magazine

Mergers and acquisitions
Davison Publishing (2006)

References

Professional and trade magazines
Companies based in New York City